= Karel Egermeier =

- Born: 28 January 1903; Teplice-Šanov, Bohemia, Austria-Hungary
- Died: 30 June 1991 (aged 88); Paris, France
- Other names: Charles Egermeier; Aiglon
- Occupation: Photographer
- Years active: 1920s–1970s
- Known for: Male and youth photography; scouting photography; illustrations for Paysage des Olympiques

Karel Egermeier (also known as Charles Egermeier or Aiglon; 28 January 1903 – 30 June 1991) was a Czech photographer active in France. He specialised in male photography.

== Life ==
Karel Egermeier was born in Teplice-Šanov in Bohemia, Austria-Hungary (now Teplice in the Czech Republic). He attended German schools, where he gradually acquired the language. His father, a shoemaker, became a widower while he was still young. In the early 1920s, Egermeier moved to France and settled in Paris. There, he worked a series of precarious jobs.

Egermeier died on 30 June 1991 in the 15th arrondisement of Paris.

== Work ==
Egermeier specialized in photography of male models, including youths and young men, often posed in athletic, scouting, or pastoral settings. His images combine studio-style control of lighting with outdoor locations and were frequently circulated as art postcards or printed portfolios aimed at collectors of male physique and youth imagery. Individual works such as the print commonly titled "Scouts" illustrate his interest in uniformed youth groups and idealized camaraderie.

== Style and themes ==
The photographer's work is characterized by carefully arranged compositions, attention to musculature and gesture, and a soft tonal range associated with mid‑20th‑century pictorial and physique photography. Recurring themes in his oeuvre include sport, scouting, bathing scenes, and rural landscapes that frame the male body as an emblem of vitality and innocence. Egermeier's images participate in wider European interwar traditions of male idealization that intersect art photography, commercial studio practice, and niche erotic markets.

== Reception and legacy ==
Egermeier's photographs have appeared in specialized publications and have been discussed in niche communities interested in historical male photography. Since the late 20th century, his prints have been traded at auction houses and online art platforms, where they are usually catalogued as works by a Czech photographer active in France, with hammer prices varying according to size, subject, and provenance. Contemporary social‑media and private‑collection accounts have further contributed to the visibility and circulation of his work.

== Art market and collections ==
Auction records show that Egermeier's photographs, including scout and athletic scenes from the 1930s and 1940s, appear periodically in European and international sales. Prices realized range from lower estimates for small prints to higher amounts for well‑documented or particularly iconic images. His work also appears in private collections, and in specialized online archives of historical photography.
